STH can refer to:

 STH (gene), a human gene
 S.T.H., or Straight To Hell, a gay pornography zine
 Somatotropin hormone or growth hormone
 Secretary for Transport and Housing, of the Government of Hong Kong
 Soil-transmitted helminth, a type of parasitic worm
 Soil-transmitted helminthiasis, caused by soil-transmitted helminths
 Sonic the Hedgehog